Bert de Jong (born 12 June 1955) is a former speed skater from the Netherlands. He competed at the 1980 Winter Olympics in 500, 1000 and 1500 m and finished in 16th, 6th and 13th place, respectively.

Personal bests: 
500 m – 38.60 (1980)
 1000 m – 1:16.18 (1980)
 1500 m – 1:59.83 (1980)
 5000 m – 7:48.97 (1976)
 10000 m – 17:21.74 (1976)

References

External links
 speedskatingstats

1955 births
Living people
Dutch male speed skaters
Speed skaters at the 1980 Winter Olympics
Olympic speed skaters of the Netherlands
People from Boarnsterhim
Sportspeople from Friesland
20th-century Dutch people